The Bilsam Sky Walker is a Polish paramotor designed and produced by Bilsam Aviation of Poznań for powered paragliding. The aircraft is supplied as a complete ready-to-fly-aircraft.

The manufacturer's website is non-functional and has been so since about 2008, so it is not clear if the company is still in business.

Design and development
The aircraft was designed to comply with the US FAR 103 Ultralight Vehicles rules. It features a paraglider-style wing, single-place accommodation and a single  Radne Raket 120 engine in pusher configuration, or optionally a  Bilsam TNA 200 powerplant, intended for heavier pilots. As is the case with all paramotors, take-off and landing is accomplished by foot.

The aircraft is built predominantly from welded steel tubing, with different sized propeller cages available to accommodate different engine and propeller combinations. Inflight steering is accomplished via handles that actuate the canopy brakes, creating roll and yaw.

Specifications (Sky Walker)

References

External links

Sky Walker
2000s Polish ultralight aircraft
Single-engined pusher aircraft
Paramotors